Mănăstire or Mânăstire may refer to:

Mănăstire, a village in Lupșa Commune, Alba County, Romania
Mânăstire, a village in Birda Commune, Timiș County, Romania

See also
Mănăstirea (disambiguation)
Mânăstirea River (disambiguation)
Mânăstirea